Pseudogekko compresicorpus, also known as the Philippine false gecko or cylindrical-bodied smooth-scaled gecko is a species of geckos. It is endemic to the Philippines.

References 

Pseudogekko
Reptiles described in 1915
Reptiles of the Philippines
Taxobox binomials not recognized by IUCN